Bayard is an unincorporated community in Columbiana County, in the U.S. state of Ohio.

History
Bayard was laid out in 1852. A post office was established at Bayard in 1852, and remained in operation until 1957.

References

Unincorporated communities in Columbiana County, Ohio
1852 establishments in Ohio
Populated places established in 1852
Unincorporated communities in Ohio